Gross regional product (GRP) is a monetary measure of the market value of all final goods and services produced in a region or subdivision of a country in a period (quarterly or yearly) of time.

A metropolitan area's GRP (gross metropolitan product, GMP), is one of several measures of the size of its economy.

See also
 Gross metropolitan product
 Gross regional domestic product
 List of Chinese administrative divisions by GDP
 List of Chinese administrative divisions by GDP per capita
 List of cities by GDP
 List of EU metropolitan areas by GDP
 List of European Union regions by GDP
 List of German states by GRP
 List of Indonesian provinces by GDP
 List of Indonesian provinces by GRP per capita
 List of NUTS regions in the European Union by GDP
 List of Russian federal subjects by GRP
 List of U.S. metropolitan areas by GDP
 List of U.S. metropolitan areas by GDP per capita
 List of U.S. states and territories by GDP

External links
 Eurostat – Statistics Explained: GDP at regional level (European regions at NUTS 2 level)
 UNSTATS (2010) Gross regional product (GRP): an introduction

Gross domestic product
Regional economics

de:Bruttoregionalprodukt